Petar Gojniković or Peter of Serbia (ca. 870 – 917) was Prince of the Serbs from 892 to 917. He ruled and expanded the First Serbian Principality and won several wars against other family members that sought the crown. He was the first Serbian monarch with a Christian (non-Slavic) name.

Petar was the son of Gojnik, the youngest son of Vlastimir (r. 831–851) of the first Serbian dynasty (ruling since the early 7th century).

Early life 

Petar was born between 870 and 874, as the son of the Prince Gojnik, the youngest son of dynastic founding father Vlastimir. His Byzantine Christian name, in relation to the previous generation of pagan names, shows the spread of Christianization among the Serbs. At the time of his birth, Serbia was ruled as an oligarchy consisting of the three brothers Mutimir, Gojnik and Strojimir, although Mutimir, the oldest, had supreme rule.

In the 880s, Mutimir seized the throne, exiling his younger brothers and Klonimir, Strojimir's son, to the court of Boris I of Bulgaria. This was most likely due to treachery. Young Petar was kept at the Serbian court of Mutimir for political reasons, but he soon fled to Branimir of Croatia.

Civil wars 
Mutimir died in 890 or 891, leaving the throne to his oldest son, Pribislav. Pribislav had only ruled for a year when Petar returned in 892, defeating him in battle and seizing the throne. Pribislav fled to Croatia with his brothers Bran and Stefan. Bran later returned and led an unsuccessful rebellion against Petar in 894. Bran was defeated, captured and blinded (a Byzantine tradition meant to disqualify a person from taking the throne). In 896, Klonimir returned from Bulgaria, backed by Tsar Boris, and invaded Serbia, taking the important stronghold Dostinika (Drsnik, in Klina). Klonimir was defeated and killed.

Bulgarian alliance 
After several failures to capture the throne by other Vlastimirovićs, including the one backed by the Bulgarians, Tsar Simeon I of Bulgaria recognized Petar as ruler. He was put under Simeon's protection, resulting in a twenty-year peace and the Serbian-Bulgarian alliance (897–917). Petar was probably not happy with his subordinate position, and may have dreamed of reasserting his independence; his situation and the succession wars of the three branches of Vlastimir's sons were to play key parts in the coming Bulgarian-Byzantine War.

Christianity presumably was spreading in his time. Also, since Serbia bordered Bulgaria, Christian influence and perhaps missionaries came from there. This would increase during the twenty-year peace.

According to Constantine VII's De Administrando Imperio, Petar ruled under the suzerainty of Leo VI and was at peace with Bulgaria for twenty years.

Bulgarian-Byzantine War, Expansion to the west, and death 

On May 11, 912, on the death of the Byzantine Emperor Leo VI the Wise, his brother Alexander III succeeded him. The unpopular, inexperienced, ill and possibly chronically drunk Alexander ruled until his death on June 6, 913. This was ideal for Symeon, who had his troops waiting in Thrace to attack Byzantium. In August 913, Symeon appeared at the walls of Constantinople, seeking no plunder, only the crown. Symeon had, in contrast to Tsar Boris, been schooled in Constantinople, embracing Byzantine ideology, and wanted to rule a joint Roman-Bulgarian Empire as Roman Emperor. Patriarch Nicholas Mystikos recognized Symeon as Emperor of Bulgaria, and married his daughter to Constantine VII. In February 914, Zoe Karbonopsina, the mother of Constantine, quickly ousted Nicholas as regent (although letting him remain the Patriarch), and she, as regent, nullified the title given to Symeon, as well as the marriage plans. Zoe's acts enraged Symeon, who went on to conquer Thrace. The Byzantines had no choice but to look for allies, sending envoys to the Magyars, Pechenegs and Serbs.

As Peter had secured the eastern border, he turned to the west, where he sought to strengthen his grip on the local Slavic principalities. He defeated Tišemir of Bosnia, annexing the valley of Bosna. He then expanded along the Neretva, annexing the Narentines, where he seems to have come into conflict with Michael Višević, the ruler of Zahumlje (with Travunija and most of Duklja), who was an important Bulgarian ally. Petar (since 897 theoretically a Bulgarian vassal, though not necessarily a willing one) met with the strategos of Dyrrhachium, Leo Rhabduchus, in Neretva, where he was offered money and greater independence in exchange for leading an army (also containing Tourkoi, Magyars) against Symeon. It seems that Petar had now agreed to join the Byzantines, but this has not been fully determined. Michael Višević heard of the possible alliance between Serbia and the Byzantines, and warned Symeon.

In 917, a Byzantine army led by Leo Phokas the Younger invaded Bulgaria, but was decisively defeated at the Battle of Achelous on 20 August 917. After Achelous, Symeon sent an army led by Pavle (the son of Bran), to take the Serbian throne, but failed, as Petar proved a good opponent. Symeon sent generals, Marmaim and Theodore Sigritzes, persuading Petar (through an oath) to come out and meet them, then captured and took him to Bulgaria where he was put in prison, dying within a year. His remains are entombed in the Church of the Holy Apostles Peter and Paul in Stari Ras, the capital. Symeon put Pavle on the Serbian throne.

Notes

References

Sources  

 
 
 
 
 Ferjančić, B. 1997, "Basile I et la restauration du pouvoir byzantin au IXème siècle", Zbornik Radova Vizantološkog Instituta, no. 36, pp. 9–30.
 
 
 
 
 
 
 
 
 
 Tibor Živković, Portreti srpskih vladara (IX—XII), Beograd, 2006, p. 11

External links
 Steven Runciman, A History of the First Bulgarian Empire, London 1930.
 

9th-century rulers in Europe
9th-century Serbian monarchs
10th-century rulers in Europe
10th-century Serbian monarchs
Vlastimirović dynasty
Eastern Orthodox monarchs
Serbian exiles
Murdered Serbian monarchs
870s births
917 deaths
Year of birth uncertain
People of the Bulgarian–Serbian Wars
10th-century murdered monarchs
Slavic warriors
Christian monarchs